Beles is a tabiya or municipality in the Tahtay Koraro district of the Tigray Region of Ethiopia. The tabiya centre is Beles village itself.

Geography 
The tabiya includes the villages of Beles, Meskelo, Chguarid, Adi Keshi and others.

Livelihood 
The population lives essentially from crop farming, supplemented with off-season work in nearby towns. The land is dominated by farmlands which are clearly demarcated and are cropped every year. Hence the agricultural system is a permanent upland farming system.

Population 
The tabiya centre of Beles holds a few administrative offices and some small shops. The main other populated places in the tabia are Meskelo, Chguarid, Adi Keshi and others.

Religion and church 
Most inhabitants are Orthodox Christians.

References 

Populated places in the Tigray Region